Göğceli Mosque is a historic log mosque situated inside the Göğceli Cemetery in Çarşamba, Samsun, northern Turkey. Built during the Seljuk Empire period in the 1200s, the log mosque was constructed without the use of nails.

Mosque building
Göğceli Mosque is situated inside the cemetery of the same name at Hasbahçe neighborhood in the Çarşamba district of Samsun Province. According to a research carried out on the wood samples taken from the building in 1990, it was built during the second reign of Seljuk Sultan of Rûm Kaykhusraw I in 1206. In 1335, the portico underwent a restoration. The single-storey mosque was constructed forming the walls with single-piece planks stacked without the use of nails. The wall planks are interlocked at edges by double-notch joint technique. Woods of elm, ash tree and chestnut were used on walls, columns, column capitals, joists, rafters and ridge-post framing. The building measures  ×  from the outside. The opening under the elevated floor enables ventilation and prevents moisture and decay of the structure. Thanks to the wedges under the building on the ground, it has survived earthquakes. The wooden structure  can be completely moved from its place to another. The mosque underwent an extensive restoration in 2007.

Interior

Forged iron nails were used only in the connection of the column capitals to the beams and in the additions made to the rafters extending towards the portico sections for women. The roof, the northern part of which is slightly curved, is a three-shouldered roof. The roof is carried by  wooden walls and struts. The roof of the women's section is supported by six columns. The ornaments, dated to early and classical Ottoman Empire period, are colored with vegetal paint. The mosque, still in use, has a capacity for 300 people.

The cemetery around the mosque is known as the cemetery of strangers.

References

External links 

Buildings and structures in Samsun Province
Çarşamba District
Indigenous architecture
Log buildings and structures
Religious buildings and structures completed in 1206
Seljuk mosques in Turkey